The Hornbæk Line is a  long standard gauge single track railway line north of Copenhagen, Denmark. It runs along the coast of Øresund between Helsingør and Gilleleje, through an area with many holiday homes. The name Hornbækbanen refers to the town Hornbæk about halfway between Helsingør and Gilleleje.

The railway is currently owned by Hovedstadens Lokalbaner and operated by the railway company Lokaltog.

History 

Initially, trains on the Hornbæk Line terminated at Grønnehave station in the northern part of Helsingør, but from 1908 all trains were continued via a connecting track along the harbour to Helsingør station, arriving and departing from a special railway halt in the street next to the station building.

In 2002, train operation on the Hornbæk Line was transferred from the operating company Helsingør-Hornbæk-Gilleleje Banen A/S (HHGB) to the newly formed railway company Lokalbanen A/S (LB) responsible for train operation on five local railways north of Copenhagen. Lokalbanen A/S merged with Regionstog A/S on 1 July 2015 to form the railway company Lokaltog A/S which is currently responsible for train operation and related passenger services on the Hornbæk Line.

Route 

The Hornbæk Line originates from Helsingør station, running north via a connecting track along the harbour to Grønnehave station in the northern part of the city. From Grønnehave station the line continues to the northwest, following the coast line of the Øresund and serving the seaside towns of Ålsgårde, Hornbæk and Dronningmølle. From Dronningmølle the line continues due west, before curving north to reach its terminus at Gilleleje where the line connects with the tracks of the Gribskov Line at Gilleleje station.

Operations

Trains on the Hornbæk Line are operated by the railway company Lokaltog. Lokaltog operates a fairly intensive timetable on the Hornbæk Line with light DMUs working a fixed 30-minute frequency most of the day. Most passengers connect from Kystbanen regional trains at Helsingør. Until late 2007, transfers to and from Gribskovbanen were also possible at Gilleleje, but after major changes to Gilleleje station, trains now operate through Gilleleje to Hillerød along Gribskovbanen. This has eliminated the need to change at Gilleleje, but at the cost of going from 20-minute to 30-minute intervals.

Heritage train
During the summer months of July and August, Nordsjællands Veterantog operates weekend steam trains on the Hornbæk Line between Grønnehave and Gilleleje. This has been a tradition since 1971.

Stations

Cultural references
Both  and  stations and the section of the railway between them are used as a locations in the first Olsen Gang film.

See also
 List of railway lines in Denmark

References

External links

  Lokaltog

Hovedstadens Lokalbaner
Railway lines in Denmark
Railway lines opened in 1906
Railway lines opened in 1916
1906 establishments in Denmark
Rail transport in the Capital Region of Denmark